Vladimir Duma (Ukrainian: Володимир Дума, born 2 March 1972 in Khust) is a former Ukrainian racing cyclist. He rode in 6 Grand Tours.

Palmares

1993
1st Stage 7 Peace Race
1996
1st Stage 2 Giro d'Abruzzo
1997
1st Coppa Colli Briantei Internazionale
1st Gran Premio Città di Felino
3rd Piccolo Giro di Lombardia
1998
 National Road Race Champion
1st Stage 6 Tour de Suisse
1999
1st Stage 5 Giro d'Abruzzo
2000
2nd Giro d'Abruzzo
1st Stage 2 
2001
3rd Gran Premio della Costa Etruschi
2002
1st Gran Premio Industria e Commercio di Prato
2003
1st Stage 4 Regio-Tour
2004
2nd National Road Race Championships
3rd Tre Valli Varesine
2006
1st Tour of Japan
1st Stage 2
3rd Giro di Toscana
2007
3rd Circuit de la Sarthe
2010
1st Bałtyk–Karkonosze Tour
3rd Pomerania Tour

References

1972 births
Living people
Ukrainian male cyclists
People from Khust
Cyclists at the 2000 Summer Olympics
Cyclists at the 2004 Summer Olympics
Olympic cyclists of Ukraine
Sportspeople from Zakarpattia Oblast
Tour de Suisse stage winners